Pierre E. L. Viette (29 June 1921 – 30 April 2011) was a French entomologist. He attended university in Dijon during the German occupation of France in World War II and subsequently spent his entire career at the Muséum national d'Histoire naturelle in Paris. He specialized in insect systematics, especially Lepidoptera. He had over 400 articles published.

Works
This is an incomplete list of his works:

Viette, P., 1949. Catalogue of the Heterocerous Lepidoptera from French Oceania. Pac Sci 3(4): 315-337.

See also
Lorymodes australis

Notes

References
 Benoît Dayrat (2003). Les botanistes et la flore de France, trois siècles de découvertes. Publications scientifiques du Muséum national d’histoire naturelle : 690 p.
 Jean Lhoste (1987). Les Entomologistes français. 1750-1950. INRA Éditions : 351 p.

1921 births
2011 deaths
French entomologists
National Museum of Natural History (France) people